Maurice Williams (born August 25, 1972), known by his stage names Hefe Wine, NuWine, and Wine-O, is an American rapper and producer from Houston, Texas. In 2006, his single "Pop My Trunk" appeared on the Billboard Top 100. He has worked with Mike Jones, Kiotti, Letoya Luckett, Daz Dillinger, Lil Wayne, and Paul Wall.

In 2014, he received media attention following the release of a sex tape featuring Williams and his former girlfriend Iggy Azalea.

Early life
Maurice Williams was raised in Houston. At the age of 15, after a troubled childhood in a dysfunctional family with an alcoholic father, he started stealing cars.

Music career
In 1996, he released his debut album, Bloody 5th. He has since released 17 albums, and secured record label deals with EMI and Universal Records.

Beyoncé featured his track "Pop My Trunk" on her 2016 Formation tour.

References

External links
 Hefe Wine's Twitter
 Hefe Wine's MTV

African-American male rappers
Rappers from Houston
Underground rappers
Southern hip hop musicians
Living people
1975 births
21st-century American rappers
21st-century American male musicians
21st-century African-American musicians
20th-century African-American people